Oedilepia is a monotypic snout moth genus described by George Hampson in 1930. Its single species, Oedilepia striginervella, was originally described under the genus Nephopterix by Hampson in 1903. It is found in Sri Lanka.

References

Moths described in 1930
Phycitinae
Monotypic moth genera
Moths of Asia